Grant Celliers (born 13 December 1978) is a South African cricketer. He played twelve first-class matches for Cambridge University Cricket Club and North West between 2001 and 2006.

See also
 List of Cambridge University Cricket Club players

References

External links
 

1978 births
Living people
South African cricketers
Cambridge University cricketers
North West cricketers
Cambridge MCCU cricketers
People from Ermelo, Mpumalanga